Whit is a given name and nickname which may refer to:

People:
Whitner Whit Bissell (1909–1996), American actor
Whit Burnett (1900–1972), American writer
John Whitfield Whit Canale (1941–2011) American football player
Whitfield Crane (born 1968), a founding member and lead singer of the rock band Ugly Kid Joe
Whit Cunliffe (1876–1966), English singer
Whit Dickey (born 1954), American jazz drummer
Whitfield Diffie (born 1944), American cryptographer and one of the pioneers of public-key cryptography
Whitney Whit Haydn (born 1949), American magician
Whit Hertford (born 1978), American actor
Whit Holcomb-Faye (born 1984), American basketball player
Whitney Whit Johnson, American television journalist
Whit Marshall (born 1973), American football player
Whit Merrifield (born 1989), American baseball player
John Whitney Whit Stillman (born 1952), American writer
Whit Taylor (American football) (born 1960), American football player
Whit Taylor (cartoonist), American cartoonist
Whitman Whit Tucker, Canadian football player
Whit Watson (born 1971), American sportscaster
Whit Williams (born 1973), American saxophonist
Whit Wyatt (1907–1999), American baseball player

Fictional characters and pen names:
Whit Masterson, pen name of a partnership of American authors Robert Allison "Bob" Wade and H. Bill Miller 
Whit Sterling, a main character in the 1947 film noir Out of the Past, played by Kirk Douglas

Lists of people by nickname